Sciara is a genus of fungus gnats in the family Sciaridae.

Species

Sciara is among the largest genus in the world, with over 700 species. Species within this genus include:

 Sciara abbreviata
 Sciara abdita
 Sciara adjuncta
 Sciara aemula
 Sciara aethiops
 Sciara africana
 Sciara albicoxa
 Sciara albifrons
 Sciara amabilis
 Sciara analis
 Sciara angustata
 Sciara antigua
 Sciara antonovae
 Sciara approximata
 Sciara aquila
 Sciara arcuata
 Sciara aspirans
 Sciara atomaria
 Sciara atrata
 Sciara atratula
 Sciara atrifrons
 Sciara attenuata
 Sciara audax
 Sciara aurosa
 Sciara barnardi
 Sciara biformata
 Sciara bispinosa
 Sciara borealis
 Sciara brevifurca
 Sciara brevipetiolata
 Sciara bullastylata
 Sciara cameronensis
 Sciara capensis
 Sciara cavicata
 Sciara cingulata
 Sciara clavata
 Sciara colorata
 Sciara columbiana
 Sciara compacta
 Sciara concinna
 Sciara confusa
 Sciara congregata
 Sciara conjuncta
 Sciara consanguinea
 Sciara contermina
 Sciara conulifera
 Sciara convergens
 Sciara copiosa
 Sciara costalis
 Sciara costata
 Sciara crassicornis
 Sciara curvinervis
 Sciara cylindrica
 Sciara delessei
 Sciara denticornis
 Sciara diacantha
 Sciara diderma
 Sciara differens
 Sciara dimidiata
 Sciara diminutiva
 Sciara diota
 Sciara dissimilis
 Sciara distigma
 Sciara distinguenda
 Sciara divergens
 Sciara diversa
 Sciara diversipes
 Sciara dives
 Sciara dolicholabis
 Sciara dolosa
 Sciara erratica
 Sciara esuriens
 Sciara evanescens
 Sciara exigua
 Sciara exilis
 Sciara exposita
 Sciara exsequialis
 Sciara familiaris
 Sciara fasciata
 Sciara fascipennis
 Sciara femoralis
 Sciara femorata
 Sciara festina
 Sciara festiva
 Sciara finitima
 Sciara flammiventris
 Sciara flavicollis
 Sciara flavicoxis
 Sciara flavimana
 Sciara flavipeura
 Sciara flaviseta
 Sciara flavofemorata
 Sciara flavomarginata
 Sciara flavoscutellata
 Sciara fletcherae
 Sciara foliorum
 Sciara fratercula
 Sciara fraterna
 Sciara frequens
 Sciara froggatti
 Sciara fuliginosus
 Sciara fumipennis
 Sciara funebris
 Sciara fuscipennis
 Sciara fuscolimbata
 Sciara futilis
 Sciara globosa
 Sciara griseicollis
 Sciara grzegorseki
 Sciara habilis
 Sciara hebes
 Sciara helmsi
 Sciara helvola
 Sciara hemerobioides
 Sciara hendersoni
 Sciara heteroptera
 Sciara heteropus
 Sciara hirtilineata
 Sciara hirtilineatoides
 Sciara horrescens
 Sciara humeralis
 Sciara hyalinata
 Sciara ignobilis
 Sciara incerta
 Sciara inconstans
 Sciara indica
 Sciara infantula
 Sciara infirma
 Sciara infixa
 Sciara infrequens
 Sciara isarthria
 Sciara isopalpi
 Sciara jacobsoni
 Sciara japonica
 Sciara jeanneli
 Sciara karnyi
 Sciara khasiensis
 Sciara kinabaluana
 Sciara kitakamiensis
 Sciara lackschewitzi
 Sciara lamprina
 Sciara latelineata
 Sciara latipons
 Sciara leucocera
 Sciara ligniperda
 Sciara longipes
 Sciara lucidipennis
 Sciara lucipeta
 Sciara luctifica
 Sciara luculenta
 Sciara lumuensis
 Sciara lurida
 Sciara luteiventris
 Sciara luteolamellata
 Sciara macleayi
 Sciara maculithorax
 Sciara maesta
 Sciara mahensis
 Sciara maolana
 Sciara marcilla
 Sciara marginalis
 Sciara marginata
 Sciara mediofusca
 Sciara medullaris
 Sciara melaleuca
 Sciara melanostyla
 Sciara mendax
 Sciara microtricha
 Sciara migrator
 Sciara militaris
 Sciara militarsis
 Sciara minutela
 Sciara modesta
 Sciara monacantha
 Sciara montivaga
 Sciara multispinulosa
 Sciara nemoralis
 Sciara neorufescens
 Sciara nepalensis
 Sciara nigrans
 Sciara nigrifemur
 Sciara nigripennis
 Sciara nigripes
 Sciara nigrita
 Sciara nigropicea
 Sciara nitidithorax
 Sciara nitulina
 Sciara nivata
 Sciara niveiapicalis
 Sciara nivicola
 Sciara notata
 Sciara nowickii
 Sciara nubicula
 Sciara ochrolabis
 Sciara opposita
 Sciara ornatula
 Sciara pahangensis
 Sciara pakkana
 Sciara pallescens
 Sciara palliceps
 Sciara parallela
 Sciara patricii
 Sciara pectilinealis
 Sciara penicillata
 Sciara pernitida
 Sciara perpusilla
 Sciara philippinensis
 Sciara philpotti
 Sciara pictipes
 Sciara polita
 Sciara politula
 Sciara praescellens
 Sciara prominens
 Sciara promiscua
 Sciara pruinosa
 Sciara psittacus
 Sciara pubescens
 Sciara pulicaria
 Sciara pycnacantha
 Sciara pygmaea
 Sciara quadrimaculata
 Sciara ratana
 Sciara reciproca
 Sciara recondita
 Sciara recta
 Sciara remyi
 Sciara rimiscutellata
 Sciara robusta
 Sciara rotunda
 Sciara rotundipennis
 Sciara rufa
 Sciara ruficauda
 Sciara satiata
 Sciara schmidbergeri
 Sciara schultzei
 Sciara sciastica
 Sciara sciophila
 Sciara scita
 Sciara scitula
 Sciara sclerocerci
 Sciara sedula
 Sciara segetum
 Sciara segmenticornis
 Sciara selangoriana
 Sciara selecta
 Sciara selliformis
 Sciara septentrionalis
 Sciara serenipennis
 Sciara sericata
 Sciara setilineata
 Sciara seychellensis
 Sciara simulator
 Sciara singhalensis
 Sciara sororia
 Sciara speciosa
 Sciara spectabilis
 Sciara speculum
 Sciara stigmatopleura
 Sciara suavis
 Sciara subfascipennis
 Sciara subrunnipes
 Sciara sumatrana
 Sciara tenompokensis
 Sciara tepperi
 Sciara tetraleuca
 Sciara thomsoni
 Sciara thoracica
 Sciara townesi
 Sciara transpacifica
 Sciara trileucarthra
 Sciara tryoni
 Sciara turrida
 Sciara uichancoi
 Sciara ulrichi
 Sciara unica
 Sciara unicolor
 Sciara unicorn
 Sciara varipes
 Sciara vecors
 Sciara vicina
 Sciara winnertzi
 Sciara viridipes
 Sciara womersleyi
 Sciara vulgaris
 Sciara vulpina
 Sciara xizangana
 Sciara yadongana
 Sciara zalampra
 Sciara zealandica
 Sciara zygocera

Description
The adult fly is small, up to 3 mm, has a dark brown body, small head and its legs and wings are comparatively long, looking like a mosquito.

Biology
These insects feed on decaying organic matter and fungi. They are often found in greenhouses. Their larvae are up to 6 mm long, white, slender and legless, with a black head and smooth semi-transparent skin which reveals the contents of the digestive tract.

Sex determination in Sciara is a different mechanism. Sciara basically has 4 pairs of chromosomes 3 pairs of autosomes and one pair of allosomes. Some special chromosomes called limited chromosomes are present in certain stages. The zygote has 3 pairs of autosomes a one or more limited chromosomes and 3 X chromosome (2 fathers’, 1 mother's). There are 2 stages in Sciara: the Germ line and the Somaline.

Germ line
The Germ line is the gametic line where the gamete formation takes place. The number of chromosomes during this line is different in males and females.

In the formation sperms of males the 1st spermatocystic division is monocentric mitosis, the maternal and paternal homologous chromosomes are separated. Then few limited chromosomes are eliminated not all of them. After this one paternal X chromosome is also eliminated. Hence male germ line (spermatogonia) cells have 3 pairs of autosomes, 2 (one maternal and one paternal) X chromosomes and a few limited chromosomes.

In the formation ova of the females the 1st ovarian division is monocentric mitosis, the maternal and paternal homologous chromosomes are separated. Then few limited chromosomes are eliminated not all of them. After this both 2 paternal X chromosome are also eliminated. Hence female germ line (oogonia) cells have 3 pairs of autosomes, 1 maternal X chromosomes and a few limited chromosomes.

Soma line
Soma line is  the vegetative stage. During early cleavage stages of the embryo limited chromosomes are eliminated. The number of chromosomes during this line is different in males and females.

In males during the 5th and 6th divisions of the embryo all the limited chromosomes are eliminated. Then paternal X chromosome is eliminated which are 2 in number. Hence male soma line cells have 3 pairs of autosomes and one maternal X chromosome.

In the females during the 5th and 6th divisions of the embryo all the limited chromosomes are eliminated. In the next stage of cleavage one paternal X chromosome is eliminated. Hence female soma line cells have 3 pairs of autosomes and one maternal and one paternal X chromosome.

Bibliography
 Pettey, F. W., 1918. A revision of the genus Sciara of the family Mycetophilidae (Diptera). Ann. Ent. Soc. America, vol. 11 no. 4.
 Ruiz MF et al.  - An Unusual Role for doublesex in Sex Determination in the Dipteran Sciara- Genetics. (2015) 
 Vilkamaa P et al - The genus Sciara Meigen (Diptera, Sciaridae) in New Caledonia, with the description of two new species - Zootaxa. (2015)

References

Sciaridae
Taxa named by Johann Wilhelm Meigen
Sciaroidea genera